Dental cements have a wide range of dental and orthodontic applications. Common uses include temporary restoration of teeth, cavity linings to provide pulpal protection, sedation or insulation and cementing fixed prosthodontic appliances. Recent uses of dental cement also include two-photon calcium imaging of neuronal activity in brains of animal models in basic experimental neuroscience.

Traditional cements have separate powder and liquid components which are manually mixed to form a viscous liquid. The liquid sets to form a brittle solid after application on the treated surface. More advanced cements, such as GIC, can come in capsules and are mechanically mixed using rotating or oscillating mixing machines.

Ideal cement properties
 Non irritant – many cements are acidic and irritate the pulp. However, on setting there is a rapid increase in pH. Polycarboxylate cement is considered the most biocompatible type due to having the most rapid pH rise.
 Provide a good marginal seal to prevent marginal leakage.
 Resistant to dissolution in saliva, or other oral fluid – a primary cause of cement failure is dissolution of the cement at the margins of a restoration.
 High strength in tension, shear and compression to resist stress at the restoration-tooth interface.
 Adequate working and setting time.
 Good aesthetics.
 Good thermal and chemical resistance.
 Opacity – for diagnostic purposes on radiographs.
 Low film thickness (ideally 25 microns).
 Retention – if an adhesive bond occurs between the cement and the restorative material, retention is greatly enhanced. Otherwise, the retention depends on the geometry of the tooth preparation.

Cements Based on Phosphoric Acid

Dental Cements Based on Organometallic Chelate Compounds

Dental applications 
Dental cements can be utilised in a variety of ways depending on the composition and mixture of the material. The following categories outline the main uses of cements in dental procedures.

Temporary restorations 

Unlike composite and amalgam restorations, cements are usually used as a temporary restorative material. This is generally due to their reduced mechanical properties which may not withstand long-term occlusal load.
 GIC – Glass Ionomer cement
 Zinc Polycarboxylate cement
 Zinc Oxide Eugenol cement
 RMGIC
"dentsply" cement

Bonded amalgam restorations 

Amalgam does not bond to tooth tissue and therefore requires mechanical retention in the form of undercuts, slots and grooves. However, if insufficient tooth tissue remains after cavity preparation to provide such retentive features, a cement can be utilised to help retain the amalgam in the cavity.

Historically, zinc phosphate and polycarboxylate cements were used for this technique, however since the mid-1980s composite resins have been the material of choice due to their adhesive properties. Common resin cements utilised for bonded amalgams are RMGIC and dual-cure resin based composite.

Liners and pulp protection 

When a cavity reaches close proximity to the pulp chamber, it is advisable to protect the pulp from further insult by placing a base or liner as a means of insulation from the definitive restoration.  Cements indicated for liners and bases include:
 Zinc oxide eugenol
 Zinc polycaroxylate
 RMGIC
Pulp capping is a method to protect the pulp chamber if the clinician suspects it may have been exposed by caries or cavity preparation. Indirect pulp caps are indicated for suspected micro-exposures whereas direct pulp caps are place on a visibly exposed pulp. In order to encourage pulpal recovery, it is important to use a sedative, non-cytotoxic material such as Setting Calcium Hydroxide cement.

Luting cements 

Luting materials are used to cement fixed prosthodontics such as crowns and bridges. Luting cements are often of similar composition to restorative cements, however they usually have less filler meaning the cement is less viscous.
 RMGIC
 GIC
 Zinc Polycarboxylate cement
 Zinc oxide eugenol luting cement

Summary of clinical applications

Composition and classification
ISO classification
Cements are classified on the basis of their components. Generally, they can be classified into categories:
 Water-based acid-base cements: zinc phosphate (Zn3(PO4)2), Zinc Polyacrylate (Polycarboxylate), glass ionomer (GIC). These contain metal oxide or silicate fillers embedded in a salt matrix.
 Non-aqueous/ oil bases acid-base cements: Zinc oxide eugenol and Non-eugenol zinc oxide. These contain metal oxide fillers embedded in a metal salt matrix.
 Resin-based: Acrylate or methacrylate resin cements, including the latest generation of self-adhesive resin cements that contain silicate or other types of fillers in an organic resin matrix.

Cements can be classified based on the type of their matrix:
 Phosphate (zinc phosphate, silico phosphate)
 Polycarboxylate (zinc polycarboxylate, glass ionomer)
 Phenolate (Zinc oxide–eugenol and EBA)
 Resin (polymeric)

Based on time of use:
 Conventional (Zinc phosphate, Zinc polycarboxylate, Zinc oxide eugenol, glass ionomer cement) 
 Contemporary (resin cements, resin modified glass ionomers).

Resin-based cements
These cements are resin based composites. They are commonly used to definitively cement indirect restorations, especially resin bonded bridges and ceramic or indirect composite restorations,  to the tooth tissue. They are usually used in conjunction with a bonding agent as they have no ability to bond to the tooth, although there are some products that can be applied directly to the tooth (self-etching products).
Panavia was created in Tamil Nadu, India. The name panavia in Hindi Sanskrit means "stick to a tooth". It is described to be one of the toughest cements in the world.

There are 3 main resin based cements;
 Light-cured – required a curing lamp to complete set
 Dual-cured – can be light cured at the restoration margins but chemically cure in areas that the curing lamp cannot penetrate
 Self-etch – these etch the tooth surface and do not require an intermediate bonding agent
Resin cements come in a range of shades to improve aesthetics.

Mechanical properties 
 Fracture toughness
 Thermocycling significantly reduces the fracture toughness of all resin-based cements except RelyX Unicem 2 AND G-CEM LinkAce.
 Compressive strength 
 All automixed resin-based cements have greater compressive strength than hand-mixed counterpart, except for Variolink II.

Zinc polycarboxylate cements 
Zinc polycarboxylate was invented in 1968 and was revolutionary as it was the first cement to exhibit the ability to chemically bond to the tooth surface. Very little pulpal irritation is seen with its use due to the large size of the polyacrylic acid molecule. This cement is commonly used for the instillation of crowns, bridges, inlays, onlays, and orthodontic appliances.

Composition:

 Powder + liquid reaction
 Zinc oxide (powder) + poly(acrylic) acid (liquid) = Zinc polycarboxylate
 Zinc polycarboxylate is also sometimes referred to as zinc polyacrylate or zinc polyalkenoate
 Components of the powder include zinc oxide, Stannous fluoride, magnesium oxide, silica and also alumina
 Components of the liquid include poly(acrylic) acid, itaconic acid and maleic acid.

Adhesion:
 Zinc polycarboxylate cements adhere to enamel and dentine by means of chelation reaction.

Indications for use:
 Temporary restorations
 Inflamed pulp
 Bases
 Cementation of crowns

Zinc Phosphate Cements 
Zinc phosphate was the very first dental cement to appear on the dental marketplace and is seen as the “standard” for other dental cements to be compared to. The many uses of this cement include permanent cementation of crowns, orthodontic appliances, intraoral splints, inlays, post systems, and fixed partial dentures. Zinc phosphate exhibits a very high compressive strength, average tensile strength and appropriate film thickness when applies according to manufacture guidelines. However the issues with the clinical use of zinc phosphate is its initially low PH when applied in an oral environment (this linked to pulpal irritation) and the cements inability to chemically bond to the tooth surface although this hasn't affected the successful long term use of the material.

Composition:

 Phosphoric acid liquid
 Zinc Oxide powder

Formerly known as the most commonly used luting agent. Zinc Phosphate Cement works successfully for permanent cementation, it does not possess anticariogenic effect, not adherent to tooth structure, acquires a moderate degree of intraoral solubility. However, Zinc Phosphate cement can irritate nerve pulp hence pulp protection is required but the use of polycarboxylate cement (Zinc polycarboxylate, glass ionomer) is highly recommended since it is a more biologically compatible cement.

Known contraindications of dental cements 
Dental materials such as filling and orthodontic instruments must satisfy biocompatibility requirements as they will be in the oral cavity for a long period of time. Some dental cements can contain chemicals that may induce allergic reactions on various tissues in the oral cavity. Common allergic reactions include stomatitis/dermatitis, urticaria, swelling, rash and rhinorrhea. These may predispose to life-threatening conditions such as anaphylaxis, oedema and cardiac arrhythmias.

Eugenol is widely used in dentistry for different applications including impression pastes, periodontal dressings, cements, filling materials, endodontic sealers and dry socket dressings. Zinc oxide eugenol is a cement commonly used for provisional restorations and root canal obturation. Although classified as non-cariogenic by the Food and Drug Administration, eugenol is proven to be cytotoxic with the risk of anaphylactic reactions in certain patients.

Zinc oxide eugenol constituents a mixture of zinc oxide and eugenol to form a polymerised eugenol cement. The setting reaction produces an end product called zinc eugenolate which readily hydrolyses producing free eugenol that causes adverse effects on fibroblast and osteoclast-like cells. At high concentrations localised necrosis and reduced healing occurs whereas for low concentrations contact dermatitis is the common clinical manifestation.

Allergy contact dermatitis has been proven to be the highest clinical occurrence usually localised to soft tissues with buccal mucosa being the most prevalent. Normally a patch test done by dermatologists will be used to diagnose the condition. Glass Ionomer cements have been used to substitute zinc oxide eugenol cements (thus removing the allergen), with positive outcome from patients.

References

 Acid-base Cements (1993) A. D. Wilson and J.W. Nicholson

Dental materials